Allermöhe is a quarter in the borough Bergedorf of the Free and Hanseatic city of Hamburg in northern Germany. The quarter consists of a rural area and the old settlement Allermöhe. In 2020 the population was 1,392 (without the new neighbourhood Neuallermöhe, which is a separate quarter).

History
In 1410 the State of Hamburg settled the Landherrenschaft Bill- und Ochsenwerder. The settlement  Allermöhe belonged to this rural village.

In 1997 the planning for a completely new neighbourhood began. From 1982 to 1994 more than 3,800 flats were constructed, creating the neighbourhood Neuallermöhe (New Allermöhe).

Geography

Politics
These are the results of Allermöhe in the Hamburg state election:

Demographics
In 2006 in the quarter Allermöhe were living 15,143 people. Resident aliens were 14.8% of the population. 932 people were registered as unemployed.

In 1999 there were 4,243 households, out of which 41.7% had children under the age of 18 living with them and 17.3% of all households were made up of individuals. The average household size was 2.79.

Population by year

including the area of Neuallermöhe

In 2006 there were 1,417 criminal offences (94 crimes per 1000 people).

There were 3 elementary schools and 4 secondary schools in the quarter Allermöhe and 6 physicians in private practice and 1 pharmacy.

Neu-Allermöhe West

Transport

Public transport is provided by buses and the rapid transit system of the S-Bahn, e.g. with the Allermöhe station.

The exits Hamburg-Allermöhe and Hamburg-Neuallermöhe West of the motorway A 25 service Allermöhe, connecting southwestern Hamburg to Geesthacht. According to the Department of Motor Vehicles (Kraftfahrt-Bundesamt), in the quarter 5,308 private cars were registered (355 cars/1000 people).

Notes

References

 Statistical office Hamburg and Schleswig-Holstein Statistisches Amt für Hamburg und Schleswig-Holstein, official website

External links

Quarters of Hamburg
Bergedorf

mk:Хамбург